The 1969 Stockholm Open was a men's tennis tournament played on indoor hard courts at the Kungliga tennishallen in Stockholm, Sweden. The tournament was held from 24 November until 29 November 1969. Unseeded Nikola Pilić won the singles title.

Finals

Singles

 Nikola Pilić defeated  Ilie Năstase, 6–4, 4–6, 6–2

Doubles

 Roy Emerson /  Rod Laver defeated  Andrés Gimeno /  Graham Stilwell, 6–4, 6–2

See also
 1969 Swedish Open

References

External links
 Association of Tennis Professionals (ATP) tournament profile
 ITF tournament edition details

Stockholm Open
Stockholm Open
Stock
November 1969 sports events in Europe
1960s in Stockholm